Hutzler is a surname. Notable people with the surname include:

 Brody Hutzler (born 1971), American actor
 Moses Hutzler (1800–1889), German-born American businessman

See also
Hetzler
Hutzler's, a defunct American department store

German-language surnames